Margaret's dragonet (Callionymus margaretae) is a species of dragonet native to the western Indian Ocean where it occurs at depths of from  on sandy or muddy substrates. It was discovered by local Austin Britton in the early 1900s. This species grows to a length of  TL.

References 

M
Fish described in 1905